USS Donald B. Beary (FF-1085) was a  built for the United States Navy.

Design and description
The Knox class design was derived from the  modified to extend range and without a long-range missile system. They displaced  at full load. Their crew consisted of 13 officers and 211 enlisted men.

The ships were equipped with one Westinghouse geared steam turbine that drove the single propeller shaft.

The Knox-class ships were armed with a 5"/54 caliber Mark 42 gun forward and a single 3-inch/50-caliber gun aft. They mounted an eight-round ASROC launcher between the 5-inch (127 mm) gun and the bridge. Close-range anti-submarine defense was provided by two twin  Mk 32 torpedo tubes. The ships were equipped with a torpedo-carrying DASH drone helicopter; its telescoping hangar and landing pad were positioned amidships aft of the mack. Beginning in the 1970s, the DASH was replaced by a SH-2 Seasprite LAMPS I helicopter and the hangar and landing deck were accordingly enlarged. Most ships also had the 3-inch (76 mm) gun replaced by an eight-cell BPDMS missile launcher in the early 1970s.

Construction and career 
The ship was leased to Turkey in 1994 and subsequently sold to them, as the Tepe-class frigate TCG Karadeniz (F-255). She was decommissioned and scrapped in 2006.

Awards, Citations and Campaign Ribbons

References : USS Donald B. Beary on NavSource.org

Notes

References 

Muavenet class

External links

Navsource images

 

Ships built in Bridge City, Louisiana
Knox-class frigates
1971 ships
Ships transferred from the United States Navy to the Turkish Navy
Cold War frigates and destroyer escorts of the United States